Coulomb excitation is a technique in experimental nuclear physics to probe the electromagnetic aspect of nuclear structure. In coulomb excitation, a nucleus is excited by an inelastic collision with another nucleus through the electromagnetic interaction. In order to ensure that the interaction is electromagnetic in nature — and not nuclear — a "safe" scattering angle is chosen.
This method is particularly useful for investigating collectivity in nuclei, as collective excitations are often connected by electric quadrupole transitions.

Atomic physics
Nuclear physics